General elections were held in Panama on 5 May 2019. Due to constitutional term limits, incumbent President Juan Carlos Varela was ineligible for a second consecutive term. Businessman and politician Laurentino Cortizo of the centre-left Democratic Revolutionary Party won the election with around 33% of the vote, narrowly defeating Rómulo Roux of the centre-right Democratic Change, who won 31% of the vote.

Electoral system
Of the 71 members of the National Assembly, 26 were elected in single-member constituencies and 45 by proportional representation in multi-member constituencies. Each district with more than 40,000 inhabitants formed a constituency. Constituencies elected one MP for every 30,000 residents and an additional representative for every fraction over 10,000.

In single-member constituencies, MPs were elected using the first-past-the-post system. In multi-member constituencies MPs were elected using party list proportional representation according to a double quotient; the first allocation of seats used a simple quotient, further seats were allotted using the quotient divided by two, with any remaining seats are awarded to the parties with the greatest remainder.

The President was elected through plurality vote in one round.

Opinion polls

Results

President

National Assembly

References

Presidential elections in Panama
Panama
General election
Elections in Panama
Election and referendum articles with incomplete results